Alwar is a district in the state of Rajasthan in northern India, whose district headquarters is Alwar city. The district covers 8,380 km2. It is bound on the north by Rewari district of Haryana, on the east by Bharatpur district of Rajasthan and Nuh district of Haryana, on the south by Dausa district, and on the west by Jaipur district.

As of 2011 it is the third most populous district of Rajasthan (out of 33) after Jaipur and Jodhpur.

Topography 
The district is a fairly regular quadrilateral in shape with its central northern portion consisting of tehsil Mandawar hemmed in by the protruding north of tehsil Behror on the west and tehsil Tijara on the east and its south eastern corner consisting of Lachhmangarh tehsil slightly flapping outward into Bharatpur district.

Ridges of rocky and precipitous hills, for the most part parallel, are a feature observable throughout the whole district which, however, is generally open to the north and east. The conspicuous feature of the district is the Aravalli range. It may be said that the hills decrease in height and breadth from south to north and west to east.

The northern and some portion of the western part of the district have shifting sand dunes.

There is no river in the district which is perennial on its entire course. Ruparel, Sabi, Chuhar Sidh and Landoha are the only rivers which flow through the district and carry the drainage of the hills.

There is no natural lake in the district. However, there are about many artificial lakes and tanks. The history of some of these can be traced to as far back as the second century A.D. Baghola Bund (tank) near Rajgarh. Some of the bunds like were constructed during the time of Mughals when Alwar forest was considered to be a haunt of wild animals and the favorite Shikar Gah of the Mughal Emperors. Later on, Maharajas of the Alwar Stale built many bunds.

Climate 
The district has a dry climate with a hot summer, a cold winter and a short monsoon season. The cold season starts by about the middle of November and continues up to about the beginning of March.

History

Ancient period 
Archaeological excavations at different places in the area have given inkling of the presence of hand-axe culture in the district.

The region was historically known as Matsya.

The territory around Bairath was included in the Maurayan empire is evidenced by the discovery of the Minor Rock Edict I and Bhabra Edict of Ashoka at this place. The disintegration of Mauryan empire was followed by the invasions of the foreigners and evolution of small principalities. The numismatic material excavated at Bairath is a clear indication that the Indo-Greek rule.

The tribal republic that emerged around this area after the fall of Pushyamitra and end of Greek invasion about the closing years of the first century B. C., was that of Arjunayanas and Yaudheyas. About the end of the first century B.C., the Arjunayanas were subdued by the Sakas. After the decline of Kushanas, the Arjunayanas recovered their independence but had to submit to the suzerainty of the Guptas about the middle of the fourth century. They were one of the nine tribal states subjugated by Samudragupta "who paid taxes, obeyed orders and performed obeisance in person to the great power".

The Pratiharas who came into prominence about the second half of the sixth century A. D., took advantage of the tottering Gupta empire and established their hold in the heart of Rajputana. Throughout the later period of Gurjar Pratihara rule, there was a triangular contest between the Pratiharas, the Palas and Rashtrakutas for supremacy in Northern India. Nagabhata I, the Pratihara king in the second quarter of eighth century A. D., successfully resisted the Arab invasions and augmented his territories. The Gwalior Inscription tells us that Matsya was seized by Nagabhata II. Nagbhata II was succeeded by Ramabhadra and the later by Bhoja. Bhoja ruled for more than 46 years and consolidated a mighty empire in Northern India. An inscription dated 960 A. D. discovered at Rajorgarh (near modern Rajgarh, Alwar) records an order issued by the Maharajadhiraja, Parameshvara, the illustrious Mathanadeva of the Gurjara-Pratihara lineage residing at Rajyapura (i.e. Rajor). Here he invoked the name of the Pratihara Emperor Vijayapaladeva as his suzerain, yet he ruled as a de facto independent king.

In 1009 A.D. Mahmud of Ghazni led an army against the king of Narayan, a place now identified by Cunningham as Narayanpur in the district. The king fought bravely in defence of his country but was defeated. The Sultan smashed the idols and returned to Ghazni with the booty. Meanwhile, Tomaras and Chauhans were the two rising powers to be reckoned with. The areas covered by Rewari and Bhiwani and parts of Alwar district, were then, included in the Bhadanaka kingdom. The Kharataragachchhapattavali of Jinapala (died V. 1295) mentions the defeat of the Bhadanakas as the chief achievement of Prithviraj Chauhan up to the Vikram year 1239. The overthrow of the Bhadanakas by the Chauhans seems to have been decisive. However, the Chauhan authority was impaired considerably after the second battle of Tarain in 1192 A.D. Thereafter, the hold of the Chauhans over this area (Alwar) slackened and the territory was retained for quite some time by the Sultans of Delhi.

Medieval period 
According to the tradition, a Jadon dynasty throve in the area now comprising the Bharatpur and Mathura districts. The Tajul-Maasir records that in A. D. 1196 Muizuddin Muhammad Ghori defeated Kunwarpala, the Jadon rai of Tahangarh (a fort about 14 miles south of Bayana). After this debacle, the lords of the history chore rajput (Jadon-Bhatti) Rajputs left that area and got scattered in the Mewat region, also at Kaman, Tijara and Sarhatta of Alwar. The descendants of Prithviraj Gurjar of Ajmer had already settled in (about 1070 A. D.) the area known as Rath (north-west region of the Alwar district) and the raja of Nimrana claims to represent the family of that great Hindu emperor.

Delhi Sultanate 
Shamsuddin Altamash, the Sultan of Delhi started his campaigns in Rajputana about 1226 and invaded Ranthambor and attained some success in Bayana, Thangir and Mewat. After his death in 1236 A. D., a concerted effort was made by the dispossessed Chauhans to regain the lost territories under the leadership of Bhagawata. Soon, Chauhan supremacy seems to have prevailed even on Mewat, thus ample opportunity to the turbulent Rajputs to regain their lost power and present a serious menace to the Delhi authority.

Balban marched in 1248 A.D. to curb the growing power of the Chauhans but attained little success. Jadon Bhatti Rajputs of Bayana (progenitors of Khanzadas) who had settled in Mewat coalesced with the Chauhans and other Rajput dynasties and commenced offensive guerilla war, sometimes even into the Delhi territory itself. After his ascendancy to the throne and consolidating his conquests, Balban paid serious attention to the raids of the Mewatis. He therefore, cleared the forest in the vicinity of the capital and built a fortress. The capital was thereby cordoned off and freed from the Mewati robbers, and for the first time in several years, the citizens breathed freely. Throughout the 13th century, the whole of Mewat was held by Hindu Jadon Bhattis.

For a hundred years, any significant trouble given by the Mewatis to the Sultans of Delhi is not heard.The relations between the Sultan and the Mewatis, by then were cordial. After the death of Sultan Firoz Shah Tughluq of Delhi, Bahadur Nahar, a Khanzada chief of Mewat is heard of gaining prestige, power and favour at the Delhi court. His stronghold was Kotila, in the Tijara hills. He played important role in wars of succession between Abu Bakr and Muhammad Shah.

Mughal Empire and Hemu 
After his victory at Panipat, Babur had settled himself at Agra. Hasan Khan Mewati joined the powerful confederacy with 12,000 horses, which was organised by Rana Sanga against Babur, The forces marched to Khanwa and Hasan Khan was among those who were slain in the battle that ensued (1527). After his victory over Rana Sanga, Babar marched towards Mewat to reduce it and entered Alwar on 7 April 1527. Hasan Khan's son, Nahar Khan, arrived begging for pardon and was bestowed a ‘pargana’ by Babur for his support. He bestowed the city of Tijara on Chin Timur Sultan who had fought in the battle of Khanwa on the right flank of Babar's army. Fardi Khan, his another follower, was given the charge of the Alwar fort. Babur himself visited and examined the fort, where he spent a night.

After the death of Shershah, his son Jalal Khan was enthroned under the title of Islam Shah. Hemu who was responsible to enthrone Adil Shah at Delhi after the death of Islam Shah in 1552. Hemu was a native of Macheri in Alwar district and is said to be a hawker of salt petre in the streets of Rewari, but rose to the status of prime-minister of Muhammad Shah Adil Sur (1554-1557) by his intelligence, loyalty and great qualities of leadership. He fought and won twenty-two battles against his master's rivals. Gradually he became the de facto ruler of Sur kingdom as his master sank into sloth and obscurity. He fought successfully a battle against the Mughal governor of Delhi, and occupied the city, and proclaimed himself as an independent ruler. He distributed the spoil among the Afghans and thus won them over to his side. He assumed for himself the title of Vikramaditya, but an arrow accidentally struck his eye and pierced his brain in the battle of Panipat (1556). He lay unconscious and was brought before the young emperor Akbar, who gave a blow of sword to Hemu, and Bairam Khan finished him off. Hemu's head was sent to Kabul and his trunk to Delhi to be placed on a gibbet. Soon, forces were sent to strongly defended forts of Deoti and Macheri (now in Rajgarh, Alwar district) where Hemu's wife and his father had taken shelter with their precious goods and treasures. After some resistance, Hemu's father was captured and his conversion to Islam attempted. But he declined and said, "For eighty years I have worshipped my God according to this (Hindu) religion why should I change it at this time, and why should I, merely from fear of my life, and without understanding it, come into way of your worship". At this, he was put to death. Hemu's widow, however, escaped with elephants and treasures to the jungles. She was pursued and a part of treasure was recovered from her.

Khanzadas of Mewat reconciled with the Delhi rulers by matrimonial alliances. Humayun had married the elder daughter of Jamal Khan, nephew of Hasan Khan Mewati. The Khanzadas became distinguished soldiers in the Imperial army.

During the reign of Akbar, Mewat was divided into two Sarkars or districts-Tijara and Alwar, in subah of Agra. Akbar while on his way to Fatehpur Sikri in 1579 visited Alwar and local traditions attribute to him the butchering of Malliks (probably Hindu converts) at Mungana (a few miles south of Alwar town on National Highway No. 8 towards Jaipur) and renaming this village as Akbarpur. Alwar formed a very important base for the launching of attacks by the Mughals on the fort of Ranthambor. It was also an important halting station between Agra and Ajmer. But the turbulent people of Mewat continued their plunderings of the imperial government and even a strong ruler like Akbar could not completely subdue them.

Akbar bestowed the jagir of Mewat on his Khanzada brother-in-law Sharif ud-Din Hussain. Sensing his rebellious attitude, Jahangir appointed Nawab Mubarij Khan as governor of Mewat. In 1661 A.D. (1058 A.H.), Alwar was bestowed as a jagir on Khalilulla Khan and some time later, Aurangzeb gave this tract to Mirza Jai Singh of Amber. However, looking to the growing influence of Mirza and the strategic position of the fort, Aurangzeb took the fort back and bestowed it on Abdul Rahim in 1077 A.H.

Petty Chieftainships 
An inscription dating Samvat 1426 and 1439 found at Macheri attests that Rajgarh, Macheri and Devati (Deoti) villages were the possessions of the Badgujar Rajputs who were bound  by matrimonial alliances with the rulers of Amber. Ashokmal or Ishwarmal who was the son of Raja Kumbh, refused to send dola to Akbar and also had quarrels with Raja Man Singh of Amber. Thereupon, a combined force of Raja Man Singh and the Delhi emperor, was dispatched against him and he was dispossessed of Devati and Rajorgarh.

Kyaranagari in Thanaghazi was the capital of Mewal Meenas whose ruler was Mokalsi at the time of Akbar's reign. The imperial forces plundered Kyara and in its place founded Mohamadabad.

About the Samvat 1656 (1599 A. D.) Madho Singh, the second son of Maharaja Bhagwandas of Amber, established a chiefship at Bhangarh and made it his capital. In Samvat 1777 (1720 A.D.), Sawai Man Singh of Jaipur attacked Bhangarh, and incorporated the territory in his kingdom.

Madan Singh, commonly known as Rao Made Chauhan, had founded the village Madanpur now known as Mandawar. In course of time, Barrod was also acquired by his descendants. Firoz Shah had forced Rao Jhama (son of Rao Hasa) to embrace Islam but the latter preferred death. However, Rao Chaand, son of Rao Jhama is said to have embraced Islam in Samvat 1499 (1442 A.D.). Thereupon, as a protest, Rajdeo who was the uncle of Chaand, abandoned Mandawar and chose Nimrana as the capital of his chiefship. The descendants of Rao Chaand extended their hold up to Bansur. But they were expelled in Samvat 1560 (1503 A.D.) from Bansur by the Shekhawats of whom Rao Shekhaji, Rao Sujaji and Rao Jagmal were most significant. Rao Sujaji made Basai as his capital whereas Jagmal established himself at Hazipur. After the death of Sujaji in Samvat 1594 (1537 A.D.) his sons Lunkaran, Raimal, Chaand and Bheruji extended their hold up to Khetri, Sikar, Khandela and Shahpura.

After the death of Aurangzeb, internal dissensions encouraged the petty chieftains to acquire power. Maharaja Surajrmal of Bharatpur conquered the Alwar fort and some of the adjacent territory. But his son Jawahar Singh, after being defeated by the Jaipur ruler at the battle of Maonda-Mandoli and lost the territory gained by his father. Marathas occupied Tijara and Kishangarh. In 1775 A.D. Pratap Singh of Naruka family acquired Alwar fort and founded the State of Alwar.

Alwar State

Maharao Raja Pratap Singh (1740-1791) 
Later, Pratap Singh was the son of Muhabbat Singh of Macheri. He was born in 1740 A.D. Sensing a danger to his life in Jaipur, he left for Rajgarh. From there, he went to Jawahar Singh of Bharatpur who bestowed on him a jagir. In 1768, Jawahar Singh insulted the Jaipur Chief by marching without intimation of his motive, through his Stale, to visit the holy lake of Pushkar near Ajmer. On his return journey, he was attacked by the Rajputs and was defeated at Maonda-Mandholi in the Tanwarati hills, north of Jaipur. "The victory was, in a great measure, due to the transfer by Pratap Singh of his supporters to the side of his liegelord on the eve of the battle." As a result, Pratap was restored to his fief of Macheri and was also allowed to build a fort at Rajgarh.

Pratap Singh gained great influence at the Jaipur court. At this time Najaf Khan, the imperial commander aided by Marathas, proceeded to expel Jats from Agra and Bharatpur. Pratap Singh aligned himself with Najaf Khan and aided him in defeating the Jats, "This aid in defeating the Jats, obtained for him the title of Rao Raja and a Sanad for Macheri, to hold direct of the crown." Pratap Singh found an opportunity of reducing the fortress of Alwar which then belonged to the Jat princes of Bharatpur and seized it. He entered the fort of Alwar in November 1775.

The followers of Pratap Singh began to own him as their feudal lord as soon as the Alwar fort was taken. He died on 26 September 1791.

Maharao Raja Sawai Bakhtawar Singh (1791-1815) 
Pratap Singh left no sons to succeed him. He had adopted Bakhtawar Singh of Thana (near Rajgarh, Alwar), younger son of Dhir Singh.

When Bakhtawar Singh occupied lands of other chiefs and strengthened his position by allying himself with the British Government. To checkmate the menacing power of the Marathas, he coalesced his troops with those of British Commander-in-Chief, Lord Lake in the battle of Laswari, a small village in the district.

Mahharaja Bakhtawar Singh of Alwar concluded a defensive and offensive treaty with the British on 14 November 1803. By this time, British supremacy was established in Northern India. The Alwar chief was rewarded with the grant of several Parganas. His vakeel, Ahmad Baksh Khan received as reward the districts of Ferozpur (from British Government) and Loharu (285 sq. miles) from the Alwar ruler under the title of Nawab.

He is said to have become deranged in the evening of his reign and showed his insanity principally by his cruelty to Muslims. The mosques were razed to the ground; the tombs of Muslim saints were dug out and the dwelling of Kamal Chisti (nephew of Salim Chisti) at Alwar, was destroyed. Observing of namaz and offering the sacrifices were forbidden.

The Rao died in 1815 A.D. One of his concubines, Musi by name, committed Sati. A magnificent chhatri or cenotaph was erected as a memorial at the side of the tank in the rear of the Alwar Palace.

Maharao Raja Sawai Viney Singh (1815-57 A.D.) 
Bakhtawar Singh adopted his nephew Viney Singh son of his brother Salah Singh of Thana, .

Great changes were made in the administrative system of the nascent State. He was a great patron of arts and letters, and attracted painters and skilled artisans from various parts of India to his service.He has left many splendid monuments to his name, such as a grand city palace, and a smaller one at Moti Dungri called Viney Vilas. But his greatest work was building of a large bandh at Siliserh, now a fine lake and tourist destination.

During the last five years of his life he suffered from paralysis. Bed ridden as he was during the Mutiny of 1857, he despatched a force consisting of about 800 infantry, 400 cavalry and four guns, to the assistance of the beleaguered British garrison at Agra. The cavalry, among whom were all Rajputs - the remainder principally Mahomedans. The Nimach and Nasirabad brigade of mutineers came upon them on the road to Agra. Deserted by their leader and the Mahomedan portion of the force, including the artillery the Rajputs suffered a severe defeat. Viney Singh died in August 1857, before the sorrowful news reached him.

Maharao Raja Sawai Sheodan Singh (1857-1874) 
Viney Singh was succeeded by his only surviving son, Sheodan Singh, who was twelve years of age at the time. The actual administration passed on to his Dewan, The Dewan had a domineering influence over the young ruler. On a night in 1858, the Rajputs, under the leadership of Lakhdhir Singh, the Thakur of Bijwar, raised the standard of revolt and raided the dwelling of the Dewan. The Dewan, sensing the danger fled away. British Political Agent got constituted a Council consisting of five Thakurs for salvaging the administration, ruined by Dewans. Another council was also constituted to carry on its duties in a most satisfactory manner until the Maharao Raja was invested with power in 1863.

As soon as the Maharao acquired the reins of his State, he renewed his contacts with the expelled Dewan. Several jagirs of Charans, Brahamans and Rajputs were escheated. This resulted in a general unrest. When the Maharao ignored their grievances,disgruntled Rajputs resolved to expel the Muslims from the State. However, Political Agent for East Rajputana took timely action. With permission of the British Government, he interfered in the administration of the State by dismissing the unscrupulous and inefficient officers.

The financial bankruptcy of the State was inevitable. A Council was composed of four Thakurs, and a Brahman. A fixed allowance and an establishment was granted to the Maharao. Reforms in the road system were effected, Post and Telegraph lines were laid and systematic survey of the land was made.

The Maharao, being divested of all powers, fell ill, and soon passed away.

Maharaj Sawai Mangal Singh (1874-1892 A. D.) 
The ruler left no heir to the throne and the families of the Barah Kothri were not unanimous in his selection. At last, Mangal Singh of Thana was supported by a majority and consequently, the Viceroy confirmed him as the ruler of Alwar. He ascended the throne on December 14, 1874. He was fifteen years and a month old at the time.

He was created an Honorary Lieutenant Colonel in the British army in 1885 and the following year, was enrolled as a Knight Grand Commander of the Most Exalted Order of the Star of India. He received the dignified title of Maharaja as a hereditary distinction in 1889 A.D.

He died at the age of 34 years, on May 22, 1892, A.D. at Nainital, owing to excess doze of liquor.

Sawai Maharaja Sir Jey Singh (1892-1937 A.D.) 
Maharaja Mangal Singh was succeeded by his minor son, Jey Singh, was invested with ruling powers on December 10, 1903, by Lord Curzon, Under his reign, the police department of the State was reorganised. In 1907-08 the official language was changed from Urdu to Hindi.

The Alwar State liberally supported the war effort of the British Government during the World War I. The Mangal Lancers and Jey Paltan fought on various fronts-Suez Canal, Egypt, Sinai, Ghaza and Rapha. The Maharaja was appointed Honorary Lieutenant Colonel in the British army on January 1, 1915, and an Honorary Colonel on 1 January 1921. At the end of the war, the title of G.C.I.E, was conferred on him on January 1, 1919, and that of G.C.S.I., on June 3, 1924. He attended the Imperial Conference held in London in 1923 as a representative of India and was a prominent figure in the Chamber of Princes and at the First Round Table Conference.

He was a fine Polo and Racquet player, a scholar of Hindu philosophy and an orator of higher order. He was an outstanding personality in many ways and participated in many National and International conferences. He frequently and fearlessly gave vent to his ideas of nationalism. He always spoke eloquently of the fine cultural heritage and greatness of India as a whole. He had equal command over English and Hindi and also knew Sanskrit.

The high British officers in India were already unhappy with him because he would never acknowledge their superiority or submit to them. Bad finances of the State coupled with Meo agitation and the Neemuchana massacre, gave the British authorities opportunity to interfere in his administration and he was in 1933, ultimately asked to leave the State. He died in Paris on 19 May 1937 leaving no lineal or adopted son. He was succeeded by a distant relative: Tej Singh Prabhakar Bahadur.

Maharaja Tej Singh (1937-1947) 
Sawai Maharaja Sir Tej Singh born on March 19, 1911, was installed on the throne on July 22, 1937.

Education made strides during his reign. A number of schools were opened and upgraded. Various communities also started hostels with State aid. Sanskrit College was also opened. The area where Hope Circus now stands was made into a beautiful marketing centre. The closing period of the Maharaja's rule was marred by communal frenzy in which several hundred people died and many more, migrated from the State. After attainment of independence, the ruler signed the instrument of accession which made the Stale a component part of the United States of Matsya.

Administration
Alwar district has 18 tehsils:
Alwar, Bansur, Behror, Govindgarh, Kathumar, Kishangarh Bas, Kotkasim, Laxmangarh, Mundawar, Rajgarh, Ramgarh, Thanagazi, Tijara, Neemrana, Reni, Malakhera Naugawan Tapukara

It has only one Lok Sabha constituency, Alwar.

Industry
The district has industrial estates such as Alwar, Bhiwadi, Shahjahanpur, Neemrana, Behror where companies such as G. S. Pharmbutor, Ashok Leyland, Pepsi, Parryware, Kajaria Ceramics, and Honda Motors have manufacturing plants.

Agriculture

Alwar has an important place in agriculture production in Rajasthan. The total geographical area of the district is 7,83,281 hectares which is about 2.5 percent of the State. In 2010–2011 the net cultivated area is 5,07,171 hectares from which about 83 percent area viz. – 4,51,546 is irrigated and the remaining 17 percent area viz. – 82,903 is unirrigated. Double cropped area is nearly 2,52,000 hectares of which 32,230 (12%) is irrigated and remaining 2,19,819 (88%) is unirrigated. Thus, the total cropped area of the district is 8,12,873 hectares. In Kharif season bajra, maize, Jowar, Kharif pulses, Arhar, sesamum, cotton, guar etc. are sown in about 3,29,088 hectares (42%) and in Rabi season wheat, barley, gram, mustard, taramira, rabi pulses are sown in about 4,52,527 hectares (58%). The main source of irrigation are wells and tube wells. By 26064 tube wells, about 192861-hectare area is being irrigated and by 57196 Wells about 265169 hectares area is irrigated. By other sources like canals, tanks about 404 hectares area is irrigated. About 35470 electric motors and 66502 Diesel pump sets are being used for irrigation purposes. The normal rainfall for the district is 657.3 mm. The average rainfall in the last ten years in the district is 724 mm. The rainfall distribution in the district is uneven and scattered which resulted in some times flood problems and some time drought position which affect the agriculture production as well as cropping pattern in Kharif & Rabi season. Thus, the agriculture in the district by and large depends on rainfall distribution. The average rainfall in 2016 up to September is 217 mm.

Places of interest

Bala Qilla (Alwar fort) situated in the Aravali Hills is one of the best forts present in Rajasthan. It is said that it has never been invaded or conquered by any king. Just behind it is the Nikumbh Mahal. There are many small palaces in the city and an old museum with a collection of paintings, armours, and old weapons.

Neelkanth temple is an old temple dedicated to Lord Shiva, built between the 6th to the 9th century.

Bhangarh Haunted Fort 

Banghar Fort is a haunted fort and the Archaeological Survey of India has put up a board on the fort gate that it is prohibited for tourists to stay inside the fort area after sunset and before sunrise. This fort has become a major tourist attraction.

This Royal Rao Haveli (300 years old), Nizam Nagar (Laxmangarh) is only 25 km from Kesroli fort, Agara-Delhi Road. Ruled & established by H.H.Rao Bhero Singh (Riyastdar), who was the Relative of H.H Yashwant Singh, the king Of Alwar.

Sariska Tiger Reserve is also located in the district, and Arvari River flows through this district. Hill Fort Kesroli, currently a heritage hotel, is also nearby at Kesroli.

Neemrana is an important heritage fort on NH-48 near Behror.

Demographics

According to the 2011 census Alwar district has a population of 3,674,179, roughly equal to the nation of Liberia or the US state of Oklahoma. This gives it a ranking of 77th in India (out of a total of 640). Its population growth rate over the decade 2001-2011 was 22.7%. Alwar has a sex ratio of 894 females for every 1000 males, and a literacy rate of 71.68%. 17.81% of the population lives in urban areas. Scheduled Castes and Scheduled Tribes make up 17.77% and 7.87% of the population respectively.

Alwar districtcomes under mainly Mewat and Ahirwal or Rath region. Behror, Mundawar, Neemrana, Bhiwadi, Tijara tehsils come under Ahirwal region. Ramgarh, kishangarh Bas, Tijara, Govindgarh, Laxmangarh comes under Mewat Region. Rajgarh, Reni, Thana Ghazi tehsils come under Meenawati and Dhundhar Region. Kathumar, Laxmangarh, Govindgarh, Ramgarh Tehsils come under Mewat - Braj Region.

Languages 

Mewati and Rathi are main language of Alwar. Mewati and Braj are spoken in East Alwar. Ahirwati is spoken in North and West Alwar. Meenawati and Jaipuri is spoken in South and South west Alwar.

Transport 

National Highway NH8 (Delhi-Jaipur-Ajmer-Ahmedabad-Bombay highway) passes through the Behror district. Alwar district is reached from New Delhi by NH8 or by Gurgaon-Sohna-Alwar highway that is being widened to six lanes.

Delhi-Jaipur railway line also passes through the district. Alwar city railway station is one of the railway stations in the district.

Education
 SILVER OAK SCHOOL
 Step By Step Public School, Alwar.
 VLM Public School, Alwar
 Alwar Public School, Alwar
 St. Anselm's Sr. Sec. School
 Chinar school, Alwar
 Vivekanand public school, Katopur, Kotkasim
 MMS Memorial School, Kotkasim
St.Xavier's School, Behror
 Happy Public School, Alwar.
 Raath International School, alwar.

References

External links

 Alwar district, Official website

 
Districts of Rajasthan
Districts in Jaipur division